Pontocerebellar hypoplasia (PCH) is a heterogeneous group of rare neurodegenerative disorders caused by genetic mutations and characterised by progressive atrophy of various parts of the brain such as the cerebellum or brainstem (particularly the pons). Where known, these disorders are inherited in an autosomal recessive fashion. There is no known cure for PCH.

Signs and symptoms 
There are different signs and symptoms for different forms of pontocerebellar hypoplasia, at least six of which have been described by researchers. All forms involve abnormal development of the brain, leading to slow development, movement problems, and intellectual impairment.

The following values seem to be aberrant in children with CASK gene defects: lactate, pyruvate, 2-ketoglutaric acid, adipic acid, and suberic acid which seems to support the thesis that CASK affects mitochondrial function.

Causes 
Pontocerebellar hypoplasia is caused by mutations in genes including VRK1 (PCH1); TSEN2, TSEN34 (PCH2); RARS2 (PCH6); and TSEN54 (PCH2 and PCH4). The genes associated with PCH3 and PCH5 have not yet been identified.

The mutated genes in PCH are autosomal recessive, which means that parents of an affected child each carry only one copy of the damaged gene. In each parent the other copy performs its proper function and they display no signs of PCH. A child inheriting two damaged copies of the gene will be affected by PCH.

Mechanism 
Mutations in the genes that cause PCH produce faults in the production of chemicals, usually enzymes, that are required for the development of nerve cells (neurons) and for properly processing RNA, which is needed for any cell to function normally. The exact mechanism by which PCH affects the development of the cerebellum and pons is not well understood.

Diagnosis

Classification 

Pontocerebellar hypoplasia is classified as follows:

Pontine and cerebellar hypoplasia is also observed in certain phenotypes of X-linked mental retardation – so called MICPCH.

Another gene that has been associated with this condition is coenzyme A synthase (COASY).

Treatment

Outcomes 
The severity of different forms of PCH varies, but many children inheriting the mutated gene responsible do not survive infancy or childhood; nevertheless, some individuals born with PCH have reached adulthood.

See also 
 Mental retardation and microcephaly with pontine and cerebellar hypoplasia

References

External links 

Neurodegenerative disorders
Neurogenetic disorders
Autosomal recessive disorders
Rare syndromes